David Ferreiro Quiroga (born 1 April 1988) is a Spanish professional footballer who plays mainly as a  winger for FC Cartagena.

Club career
Born in Baños de Molgas, Ourense, Galicia, Ferreiro finished his development at Pabellón Ourense CF after starting out at SD Nogueira de Ramuín. In 2006, he signed with CD Ourense: initially assigned to the reserves in Tercera División, he became a regular starter for the first team during the 2007–08 season, which ended in relegation from Segunda División B.

Ferreiro continued to compete in the third division the following years, representing CF Atlético Ciudad and Zamora CF. On 2 August 2011, he signed a contract with Granada CF who paid his buyout clause of €20,000, and was immediately loaned to Cádiz CF.

In the summer of 2012, still owned by Granada, Ferreiro joined Racing de Santander. He made his Segunda División debut on 19 August, starting in a 0–1 home loss against UD Las Palmas. His only goal of the campaign, which ended in relegation, came on 12 May of the following year in the 1–0 home defeat of Real Madrid Castilla.

In the 2014 off-season, after a third loan, now to Hércules CF, Ferreiro was released by Granada and moved to CD Lugo also in the third tier. He signed with SD Huesca of the same league on 20 June 2016, achieving promotion to La Liga at the end of 2017–18.

Ferreiro made his debut in the Spanish top flight on 19 August 2018, coming on as a 90th-minute substitute for Damián Musto in a 2–1 away win against SD Eibar. He scored his first goal in the competition the following 5 January, equalising an eventual 2–1 home victory over Real Betis. 

On 3 July 2022, Ferreiro terminated his contract with Huesca, leaving the club with 216 competitive appearances. The following day, the 34-year-old joined second-division FC Cartagena on a two-year deal.

Honours
Huesca
Segunda División: 2019–20

References

External links

1988 births
Living people
People from Allariz – Maceda
Sportspeople from the Province of Ourense
Spanish footballers
Footballers from Galicia (Spain)
Association football wingers
La Liga players
Segunda División players
Segunda División B players
Tercera División players
CD Ourense footballers
CF Atlético Ciudad players
Zamora CF footballers
Granada CF footballers
Cádiz CF players
Racing de Santander players
Hércules CF players
CD Lugo players
SD Huesca footballers
FC Cartagena footballers